Thalai Koduthaan Thambi is 1959 Tamil-language historical action film , directed and produced by T. R. Sundaram of Modern Theatres, and written by Murasoli Maran. Music was by Viswanathan–Ramamoorthy. It stars S. S. Rajendran, R. S. Manohar and Malini.

Plot 
The film is about princess, who falls in love with a commoner from another kingdom. The Kings, however object to her marrying a common man. The princess feigns her suicide and elopes with her lover to his kingdom. Upon reaching it, the princess is shocked when she discovers that the man is already married and has a child too. The husband loses both his arms in an accident and hands over his first son born his first wife, to a friend. The princess also delivers a son, who grows up with her, on her death bed. The princess reveals the truth about her husband and about the existence of a stepbrother. The enraged son vows to kill the man who duped his mother. In the course of events, the two brothers end up in the same prison, and when they meet they are unaware of their real identity. What happens to the brothers as they find out about their real identities forms the rest of the film.

Cast 
Cast according to the opening credits of the film

Male cast
 S. S. Rajendran as Indrajith
 K. R. Ramasamy as Inbasakaran
 S. Manohar as Vijayan
 T. K. Ramachandran as Naganathan
 V. R. Rajagopal as Manmadhan
Male support cast
 Narayana Pillai, Sethupathi, K. V. Srinivasan,Kittan, Thirupathisami, SanthanamM. A. Ganapathi and V. P. S. Mani.

Female cast
 Miss Malini as Poongodi
 Tambaram Lalitha as Shanthavalli
 T. P. Muthulakshmi as Radhi
 P. S. Gnanam as Punidhai
 K. V. Shanthi
 Baby Uma as Poongodi's daughter

Soundtrack 
Music was by Viswanathan–Ramamoorthy, lyrics were by Pattukottai Kalyanasundaram, Suratha and A. Maruthakasi.

References

External links 
 

1950s action drama films
1950s historical drama films
1950s Tamil-language films
1959 drama films
1959 films
Films about brothers
Films about siblings
Films directed by T. R. Sundaram
Films scored by Viswanathan–Ramamoorthy
Indian action drama films
Indian black-and-white films
Indian historical drama films